The Australian Faunal Directory (AFD) is an online catalogue of taxonomic and biological information on all animal species known to occur within Australia. It is a program of the Department of Climate Change, Energy, the Environment and Water of the Government of Australia. By May 12, 2021, the Australian Faunal Directory has collected information about 126,442 species and subspecies. It includes the data from the discontinued Zoological Catalogue of Australia and is regularly updated. Started in the 1980s, it set a goal to compile a "list of all Australian fauna including terrestrial vertebrates, ants and marine fauna" and create an "Australian biotaxonomic information system". This important electronic key and educative package enables faster and orderly identification of Australian centipede species .

References

 http://www.environment.gov.au/science/abrs/publications/fauna
 http://www.environment.gov.au/science/abrs/publications/zoological-catalogue-of-australia

External links 

 

Fauna of Australia
Australian science websites